The 2004 Belgian Figure Skating Championships took place between 28 and 29 November 2003 in Deurne. Skaters competed in the disciplines of men's and ladies' singles.

Senior results

Men

Ladies

External links
 results

Belgian Figure Skating Championships
2003 in figure skating
Belgian Figure Skating Championships, 2004